Sebastian Tyrała (born 22 February 1988) is a Polish former professional footballer. He played primarily as an attacking midfielder.

Club career 
Tyrała was born in Racibórz, Poland. He moved to Borussia Dortmund as an 11-year-old boy and passed through all the youth ranks. He was named Sportsman of 2004 in Soest. At age 16, he was selected for Borussia Dortmund's Senior squad. But in 2005, he ruptured the cruciate ligament in his left knee and was sidelined for six months.

Tyrała was honoured by the German Football Association (DFB) with a third place in the category "under 17s" in 2005. He won the "Adler Cup" with Borussia Dortmund's under 17s and became the tournaments top goal-scorer with seven goals. In April 2005, he injured his medial meniscus in training. He made several appearances in preparation for the 2006–07 season and made his full Bundesliga debut on 22 September in an away defeat to Borussia Mönchengladbach. Tyrała also played for Borussia Dortmund's second team and wore the number 28 on his shirt.

After twelve years with Borussia Dortmund, he announced his departure on 18 May 2010 and signed a two-year contract with VfL Osnabrück. On 5 June 2014, he joined FC Rot-Weiß Erfurt.

In May 2019, Tyrała announced his retirement from professional football due to injury problems. He has since then worked as a manager in amateur football for BV Bad Sassendorf, Türkspor Dortmund and TuS Bövinghausen.

International career 
Tyrała has played for Germany's U-19 national team. He scored his first goal in September 2006. In 2007, Tyrała played for Germany in the under 19's European Championships in Austria.

However, he requested a Polish passport, desiring to play for Poland. On 21 November 2008, Tyrała was called up by the Polish national team coach Leo Beenhakker to their national team for friendly matches in Antalya, Turkey. He made his first appearance for the Polish national team in a friendly against Serbia on 14 December 2008.

References

External links 
 
 Sebastian Tyrała at kicker.de 

Living people
1988 births
People from Racibórz
Sportspeople from Silesian Voivodeship
Association football midfielders
Polish footballers
Poland under-21 international footballers
Poland international footballers
Germany youth international footballers
German footballers
Polish emigrants to Germany
Naturalized citizens of Germany
Bundesliga players
2. Bundesliga players
3. Liga players
Borussia Dortmund players
Borussia Dortmund II players
VfL Osnabrück players
SpVgg Greuther Fürth players
FC Rot-Weiß Erfurt players
1. FSV Mainz 05 II players